Fancy Footwork is the second studio album by Canadian electro-funk duo Chromeo, released on May 8, 2007 by Turbo Recordings and Last Gang Records. The album spawned three singles: "Fancy Footwork", "Tenderoni", and "Bonafied Lovin". In the United States, Fancy Footwork reached number eleven on the Top Electronic Albums chart and number twenty-five on the Top Heatseekers chart.

A deluxe edition of the album was released in July 2008, containing a bonus disc of remixes and bonus tracks, as well as music videos. A special edition titled Fancier Footwork was released digitally in June 2008, consisting of three bonus tracks and fifteen remixes.

Track listing

Personnel
Credits adapted from the liner notes of Fancy Footwork.

 Chromeo – executive producer, instruments, production, recording, vocals
 Coralie Bailleuil – image manipulation
 Adrien Blanchat – image manipulation
 Jean-Charles de Castelbajac – shoes
 Coco – additional female vocals 
 Simon Davey – mastering
 Charlotte Delarue – art direction
 Sébastien Gerbi – mixing assistance
 Adrian "A-Dogg" Harpham – percussion, rototoms 
 Craig Hodgson – saxophone 
 Kevin Kocher – management
 Roxane Lagache – model

 Farah Malick – additional female vocals 
 Santiago Marotto – art direction
 Mart One – percussion 
 Samy Osta – recording 
 Ozzie – additional female vocals 
 Harry Peccinotti – photography
 Jérémie Rozan – art direction
 Oliver Sasse – project coordinator for Turbo Recordings
 Greg Smith – recording 
 Tiga – executive producer
 Melisa Young – additional vocals 
 Philippe Zdar – mixing

Charts

Release history

In popular culture
 A remix of the song was featured in the 2007 racing video game Need for Speed: ProStreet.
 The song was featured in the dancing video game Just Dance 2020.

References

2007 albums
Chromeo albums
Last Gang Records albums
Modular Recordings albums
V2 Records albums
Vice Records albums